Atkins-Johnson Farmhouse Property, also known as the Alkins Farm, is a historic home and farm complex located at Gladstone, Clay County, Missouri. The original log section of the farmhouse was built about 1826; it was enlarged to the present I-house about 1853.  Also on the property are the contributing root cellar and entrance structure, a milk house, a well and pump structure, and a vehicular and equipment garage.

It was listed on the National Register of Historic Places in 2007.

References

Houses on the National Register of Historic Places in Missouri
Houses completed in 1853
Buildings and structures in Clay County, Missouri
National Register of Historic Places in Clay County, Missouri